Phonograph cylinders are the earliest commercial medium for recording and reproducing sound. Commonly known simply as "records" in their era of greatest popularity (c. 1896–1916), these hollow cylindrical objects have an audio recording engraved on the outside surface, which can be reproduced when they are played on a mechanical cylinder phonograph. In the 1910s, the competing disc record system triumphed in the marketplace to become the dominant commercial audio medium.

Early development

In December 1877, Thomas Edison and his team invented the phonograph using a thin sheet of tin foil wrapped around a hand-cranked, grooved metal cylinder. Tin foil was not a practical recording medium for either commercial or artistic purposes, and the crude hand-cranked phonograph was only marketed as a novelty, to little or no profit. Edison moved on to developing a practical incandescent electric light, and the next improvements to sound recording technology were made by others.

Following seven years of research and experimentation at their Volta Laboratory, Charles Sumner Tainter, Alexander Graham Bell, and Chichester Bell introduced wax as the recording medium, and engraving, rather than indenting, as the recording method. In 1887, their "Graphophone" system was being put to the test of practical use by official reporters of the US Congress, with commercial units later being produced by the Dictaphone Corporation. After this system was demonstrated to Edison's representatives, Edison quickly resumed work on the phonograph. He settled on a thicker all-wax cylinder, the surface of which could be repeatedly shaved down for reuse. Both the Graphophone and Edison's "Perfected Phonograph" were commercialized in 1888. Eventually, a patent-sharing agreement was signed and the wax-coated cardboard tubes were abandoned in favor of Edison's all-wax cylinders as an interchangeable standard format.

Beginning in 1889, prerecorded wax cylinders were marketed. These have professionally made recordings of songs, instrumental music or humorous monologues in their grooves. At first, the only customers for them were proprietors of nickelodeons—the first jukeboxes—installed in arcades and taverns, but within a few years, private owners of phonographs were increasingly buying them for home use. Unlike later, shorter-playing high-speed cylinders, early cylinder recordings were usually cut at a speed of about 120 rpm and can play for as long as three minutes. They were made of a relatively soft wax formulation and would wear out after they were played a few dozen times. The buyer could then use a mechanism which left their surfaces shaved smooth so new recordings could be made on them.

Cylinder machines of the late 1880s and the 1890s were usually sold with recording attachments. The ability to record as well as play back sound was an advantage of cylinder phonographs over the competition from cheaper disc record phonographs, which began to be mass-marketed at the end of the 1890s, as the disc system machines could be used only to play back prerecorded sound.

In the earliest stages of phonograph manufacturing, various incompatible, competing types of cylinder recordings were made. A standard system was decided upon by Edison Records, Columbia Phonograph, and other companies in the late 1880s.

Over the years, the type of wax used in cylinders was improved and hardened, so that cylinders could be played with good quality over 100 times. In 1902, Edison Records launched a line of improved, hard wax cylinders marketed as "Edison Gold Moulded Records". The major development of this line of cylinders is that Edison had developed a process that allowed a mold to be made from a master cylinder, which then permitted the production of several hundred cylinders to be made from the mold. The process was labeled "Gold Moulded" because of the gold vapor that was given off by gold electrodes used in the process.

Originally, all cylinders sold needed to be recorded live on the softer brown wax, which wore out after as few as 20 plays. Later cylinders were reproduced either mechanically or by linking phonographs together with rubber tubes.

Commercial packaging

The earliest soft wax cylinders were sold wrapped in thick cotton batting. Later, molded hard-wax cylinders were sold in boxes with a cotton lining. Celluloid cylinders were sold in unlined boxes. These protective boxes were normally kept and used to house the cylinders after purchase. Their general appearance allowed bandleader John Philip Sousa to deride their contents as "canned music", an epithet he borrowed from Mark Twain.

Hard plastic cylinders

On March 20, 1900, Thomas B. Lambert was granted a US patent (645,920) that described a process for mass-producing cylinders made from celluloid, an early hard plastic. ( of France was producing celluloid cylinders as early as 1893, but they were individually recorded rather than molded.) That same year, the Lambert Company of Chicago began selling cylinder records made of the material. They would not break if dropped and could be played thousands of times without wearing out. The color was changed to black in 1903, but brown and blue cylinders were also produced. The coloring was purportedly because the dyes reduced surface noise. Unlike wax, the hard, inflexible material could not be shaved and recorded over, but it had the advantage of being nearly permanent.

This superior technology was licensed by the Indestructible Record Company in 1906 and Columbia Phonograph Company in 1908. The Edison Bell company in Europe had separately licensed the technology and were able to market Edison's titles in both wax (popular series) and celluloid (indestructible series).

In late 1908, Edison had introduced wax cylinders that played for nominally 4 minutes (instead of the usual 2) under the Amberol brand. They were made from a harder (and more fragile) form of wax to withstand the smaller stylus used to play them. The longer playing time was achieved by reducing the groove size and placing them half as far apart. In 1912, the Edison company eventually acquired Lambert's patents to the celluloid technology, and almost immediately started production under a variation of their existing Amberol brand as Edison Blue Amberol Records.

Edison designed several phonograph types, both with internal and external horns for playing these improved cylinder records. The internal horn models were called Amberolas. Edison marketed its "Fireside" model phonograph with a gearshift and a 'model K' reproducer with two different styli, which allowed it to play both two-minute and four-minute cylinders.

Decline

Cylinder records continued to compete with the growing disc record market into the 1910s, when discs won the commercial battle. In 1912, Columbia Records, which had been selling both discs and cylinders, dropped the cylinder format, while Edison introduced his  Diamond Disc format, played with a diamond stylus. Beginning in 1915, new Edison cylinder issues consisted of re-recordings from Edison discs; they therefore had lower audio quality than the disc originals. Although his cylinders continued to be sold in steadily dwindling and eventually minuscule quantities, Edison continued to support the owners of cylinder phonographs by making new titles available in that format until the company ceased manufacturing all records and phonographs in November 1929.

Later applications

Cylinder phonograph technology continued to be used for Dictaphone and Ediphone recordings for office use for decades.

In 1947, Dictaphone replaced wax cylinders with their Dictabelt technology, which cut a mechanical groove into a plastic belt instead of into a wax cylinder. This was later replaced by magnetic tape recording. However, cylinders for older style dictating machines continued to be available for some years, and it was not unusual to encounter cylinder dictating machines into the 1950s.

In the late 20th and early 21st century, new recordings have been made on cylinders for the novelty effect of using obsolete technology. Probably the most famous of these are by They Might Be Giants, who in 1996 recorded "I Can Hear You" and three other songs, performed without electricity, on an 1898 Edison wax recording studio phonograph at the Edison National Historic Site in West Orange, New Jersey. This song was released on Factory Showroom in 1996 and re-released on the 2002 compilation Dial-A-Song: 20 Years of They Might Be Giants. The other songs recorded were "James K. Polk", "Maybe I Know", and "The Edison Museum", the last a song about the site of the recording. These recordings were officially released online as MP3 files in 2001.

Small numbers of cylinders have been manufactured in the 21st century out of modern long-lasting materials. Two companies engaged in such enterprise are the Vulcan Cylinder Record Company of Sheffield, England, and the Wizard Cylinder Records Company in Baldwin, New York.

In 2010 the British steampunk band The Men That Will Not Be Blamed for Nothing released the track "Sewer", from their debut album, Now That's What I Call Steampunk! Volume 1 on a wax cylinder in a limited edition of 40, of which only 30 were put on sale. The box set came with instructions on how to make your own cylinder player for less than £20. The BBC covered the release on Television on BBC Click, on BBC Online, and on Radio 5 Live.

In June 2017 the Cthulhu Breakfast Club podcast released a special limited wax cylinder edition of a show.

In April 2019, the podcast Hello Internet released ten limited edition wax cylinder recordings.

Preservation of cylinder recordings

Because of the nature of the recording medium, playback of many cylinders can cause degradation of the recording. The replay of cylinders diminishes their fidelity and degrades their recorded signals. Additionally, when exposed to humidity, mold can penetrate a cylinder's surface and cause the recording to have surface noise. Currently, the only professional machines manufactured for the playback of cylinder recordings are the Archéophone player, designed by Henri Chamoux and the "Endpoint Cylinder and Dictabelt Machine" by Nicholas Bergh. The Archéophone is used by the Edison National Historic Site, Bowling Green State University (Bowling Green, Ohio), The Department of Special Collections, Donald C Davidson Library at The University of California, Santa Barbara, and many other libraries and archives, including the Endpoint by The New York Public Library for the Performing Arts.

In an attempt to preserve the historic content of the recordings, cylinders can be read with a confocal microscope and converted to a digital audio format. The resulting sound clip in most cases sounds better than stylus playback from the original cylinder. Having an electronic version of the original recordings enables archivists to open access to the recordings to a wider audience. This technique also has the potential to allow for reconstruction of damaged or broken cylinders.

Gallery

Demonstration

Audio/video recordings of a recording and playback demonstration at the Thomas Edison National Historical Park in West Orange, New Jersey.

See also
 Archéophone
 Audio format
 Audio storage
 Cylinder Audio Archive
 Mapleson Cylinders
 Telediphone
 Volta Laboratory and Bureau

References

General references

Inline citations

Further reading

External links

 Tinfoil.com – History of phonograph cylinders; listen to many examples dating from 1878 through 1912
 UCSB Cylinder Audio Archive, University of California, Santa Barbara: Streaming and downloadable versions of over 10,000 cylinders.
 Vulcan Cylinder Record Company
 Ethnographic wax cylinders from the British Library

Audio storage
Audiovisual introductions in 1877
Audiovisual introductions in 1888
Thomas Edison
Alexander Graham Bell
American inventions
Obsolete technologies